Vicente Simón Foj (born 1 March 1969), is a Spanish retired footballer who played as a forward.

Club career
Born in Segorbe, Simón spent most of his playing career with CD Teruel in the lower divisions of Spanish football.  Simón turned professional with CD Castellón in 1990, and after a spell on loan at CD Almazora, he played 3 games in the 1990–91 La Liga.

References

External links

1969 births
Living people
Spanish footballers
Association football forwards
La Liga players
Segunda División players
CD Castellón footballers